Rhombipoma is a genus of small sea snails with calcareous opercula, marine gastropod mollusks in the family Colloniidae.

Species
Species within the genus Rhombipoma include:
 Rhombipoma rowleyana McLean, 2012

References

External links
 To World Register of Marine Species

Colloniidae
Monotypic gastropod genera